is a Japanese manga series written and illustrated by Motoi Yoshida. It was published in Kodansha's seinen manga magazine Evening from 2001 to 2004, with its chapters collected in five tankōbon volumes by Kodansha. The series tells of the taboo love affair that develops between 27-year-old Koshiro, and his teenage 15-year-old younger sister, Nanoka.

It was adapted into a 13-episode anime television series by A.C.G.T. Directed by Takahiro Omori, it was broadcast on TV Asahi from April to June 2004; only twelve episodes of the series aired, with the remaining episode streamed online and later included in both DVD releases and when the series aired in reruns as the eighth episode. The anime series was licensed for release in North American by Geneon Entertainment, which released three DVD volumes in 2005.

Synopsis
Twenty-seven-year-old Koshiro Saeki, who lives with his father Zenzo, is dumped by his girlfriend Shoko of two years, who claims he was too cold and she had found someone else. While on a train the morning after, he sees high school student Nanoka Kohinata looking at a button and crying. Later, as she is getting off the train, she unknowingly drops her train pass and Koshiro follows to return it to her. Koshiro finds himself watching her sudden smile as she notices the cherry blossoms are in bloom. Later, Koshiro is leaving his job at a marriage-arranging company with a coworker when he encounters the same girl again. Having two free tickets to a nearby amusement park, he gives them to her. To his surprise, she asks him to go with her. While on the Ferris wheel, the girl explains that she was crying on the train because she'd been rejected by a boy she had been in love with for several years. Koshiro ends up telling her about his own break up, and cries while she comforts him.

As they leave the park together, having enjoyed the outing and expecting to part and never meet again, they run into their father and are shocked to discover they are siblings. Nanoka moved to Tokyo just that morning to live with them because their home is closer to her new high school. As Koshiro hadn't gone home the night before, he hadn't learned of her arrival. Since they had grown up living separately, they didn't know what the other looked like.

As the series progresses, Koshiro finds himself unable to rid himself of the attraction that he felt for Nanoka when he first met her. Instead, his love and desire continue to grow, despite his attempts to fight them. Entering womanhood, Nanoka also develops feelings for her older brother, only increasing Koshiro's struggle. In near desperation, he moves out of the family home to remove himself from temptation and attempts to keep his coworker, Kaname Chidori, from finding out the truth behind his brusqueness with Nanoka.

However, the solution is only temporary, as Nanoka begins visiting Koshiro regularly, cooking him meals and spending time with him. Eventually, unable to resist their feelings anymore, they share a passionate kiss and have sex with each other. Unsure of what to do now that they have broken a societal taboo, they visit their parents, before contemplating committing suicide together. In the end, they decide to live, and to continue their relationship.

Characters

A 27-year old largely-built man usually sporting a five o'clock shadow, Koshiro works for a marriage-arranging company and lives with his divorced father. He had almost completely forgotten that he had a little sister until she came and moved in with them. He finds himself battling with society's definition of what an older brother should be and his sexual and romantic feelings for his sister.

Nanoka is a 15-year-old high school girl who has moved to Tokyo to live with her father and older brother to attend school. A bright and active girl, she grows increasingly fond of her older brother, though is regularly annoyed with his brusque nature. Her friends unwittingly tease her about having a "brother complex", not realizing that Nanoka is actually falling in love with him.

Zenzo is Koshiro and Nanoka's father. He is prone to bouts of hysterical worry and cares for both of his children, though in particularly Nanoka.

Makie is Koshiro and Nanoka's mother. Until moving to Tokyo, Nanoka lived with her mother, who runs a hair salon. She rarely sees Koshiro, though she speaks to him fondly when he visits.

Kaname is Koshiro's supervisor and appears to be around his age. While she is often critical of his sloppy appearance, she encourages him where she can. When Koshiro first sees Nanoka outside his job, Chidori encourages him to go on a date with her, not learning until later that Nanoka is his sister. She eventually becomes suspicious of the siblings' relationship, and upon realizing she is correct, attempts to get them to end things, even trying to convince Nanoka that she is dating Koshiro. When she realizes that the siblings can't be happy unless they are together, she decides to leave them alone in hopes they can live with their choice. She shares the same name as Kaname Chidori from Full Metal Panic!.

Odagiri works in the same office as Koshiro and Kaname Chidori. He is the office pervert, who always wants a teenage girl as his significant other, revised after meeting Nanoka to wanting a younger teenage sister. He serves as a contrast to Koshiro, and as comic relief.

Futaba is Nanoka's first friend at her high school. She has brown hair worn in two twintails, and wears glasses.

Yoko is a friend of both Nanoka and Futaba. with short blonde hair. She attends the same high school as them, but is in a different class. In Episode 3, Youko is shown to have a boyfriend who went to cram school with her. Before meeting Nanoka, she and Futaba went to the same middle school together.

Kazuya is a male classmate of Nanoka and Futaba. He has an older sister who is two years older than him.

Shoko was Koshiro's ex-girlfriend at the beginning of the series. The reason she broke up with him was because she believed that he was "too cold" towards her and she had found another boyfriend.

Media

Manga
Written and illustrated by Motoi Yoshida, Koi Kaze was serialized in Kodansha's seinen manga magazine Evening from the September 2001 to the 2004. Kodansha collected its 35 chapters in five tankōbon volumes, released from March 22, 2002,  to December 21, 2004.

Volume list

Anime
A 13-episode anime television series by Geneon Entertainment and Rondo Robe and directed by Takahiro Omori, was broadcast on TV Asahi from April 1 to June 17, 2004. The series also aired on Kids Station. TV Asahi refused to air the eighth episode; it aired on Kids Station and also streamed online on the Geneon Entertainment website and included in the subsequent DVD releases. Geneon released the series across five DVD volumes in Japan, with the first volume released on July 23, 2004, and the final volume released November 25, 2004.

The anime series is licensed for release in North American by Geneon USA which released it across three DVD volumes in 2005.

The episodes uses two pieces of theme music. "Koi Kaze" by éf is used as the opening song for all of the episodes except for episode twelve, which does not have an opening sequence.  by Masumi Itō is used for the series ending theme.

Episode list

CDs
A full-size version of the series ending theme, "Futari Dakara" was released to CD single by Masumi Itō on May 26, 2004. A complete CD soundtrack followed on July 23, 2004. The soundtrack contains 31 tracks, including various instrumental background pieces composed by Masanori Takumi and Makoto Yoshimori, the full size opening theme, and the TV version of the ending theme.

Reception
"Koi Kaze is not a series which is going to suit everyone's tastes due to its subject matter. It has the potential, though, to be the year's premiere romantic anime series." — Theron Martin, Anime News Network.

"With the first third of the show on this volume, it's definitely one of the better structured doomed romances that I've seen in anime in a long time." — Chris Beveridge, Mania.

"There are a million ways this series could have gone wrong. Instead, Koi Kaze deserves the highest marks possible for its thoughtful, honest, and mature handling of such a difficult and controversial issue." — Carlos Ross, THEM Anime Reviews.

"Koi Kaze is not a reassuring show, but if it skirts the edge of disaster instead of plunging in, it may offer warmth to lonely, troubled people, and that's worth a lot." — Christian Nutt, Newtype USA.

References

External links
 Official Geneon Koi Kaze anime website 
 Koi Kaze at Internet Movie Database
 

Drama anime and manga
Incest in anime and manga
Incest in television
Kodansha manga
Geneon USA
NBCUniversal Entertainment Japan
Romance anime and manga
Seinen manga
Slice of life anime and manga
TV Asahi original programming